Mountain Combat Boots (MCB) are durable, hiking-style combat boot used by the likes of Mountain troops. The boot is designed for rugged terrain and has the ankle stability, support and mobility required in a mountainous environment.

Users

Argentina
Argentine soldiers have worn Alta Montaña type mountain combat boots during the Falklands war made by El Resero.

France

The Chasseurs Alpins wear mountain combat boots on parade.

Germany

The Gebirgsjäger wear mountain combat boots as well as on parade.

United States

Mountain Combat Boots (MCB) are issued to U.S. Soldiers deploying to Afghanistan as part of the Rapid Fielding Initiative process. Both Hot Weather and Temperate Weather variants of the MCBs have been issued by the Army.

See also
Army Combat Boot
Modular Boot System

Sources

Military boots
United States Army uniforms